USS George H.W. Bush (CVN-77) is the tenth and final  supercarrier of the United States Navy. She is named for the 41st President of the United States and former Director of Central Intelligence George H. W. Bush, who was a naval aviator during World War II. The vessel's callsign is Avenger, after the TBM Avenger aircraft flown by then-Lieutenant George H. W. Bush in World War II. Construction began in 2003 at Northrop Grumman, in Newport News, Virginia and was completed in 2009 at a cost of $6.2 billion and her home port is Naval Station Norfolk, Virginia.

Naming

George H. W. Bush became one of the U.S. Navy's youngest pilots when he received his Naval Aviator wings and naval commission on 9 June 1943, three days before turning 19. He flew torpedo bombers off  on active duty from August 1943 to September 1945 during World War II. On 2 September 1944, during a mission over the Pacific, Japanese anti-aircraft fire hit his plane. The Navy submarine  rescued him. He was awarded the Distinguished Flying Cross and three Air Medals for courageous service in the Pacific Theater.

USS George H.W. Bush is the second United States aircraft carrier to be named after a naval aviator ( was the first) and the second, following , to be named after a then living former president (Ronald Reagan was christened in 2001 while Reagan was still alive).

Ship's seal
Each element of the seal is significant for its relevance to the ship's namesake, naval aviation, naval service, and the nation. There are six prominent features of the seal, beginning with the 41 white stars, symbolizing the ship's namesake (the 41st president). The rays of light that appear on the seal's horizon represent Bush's concept of a "thousand points of light", wherein he urged Americans to find meaning and reward by serving a purpose higher than themselves. The graphic depiction of the aircraft carrier reflects the carrier, as both a symbol and instrument of American strength as a force for freedom. Above the carrier are the overhead profiles of a TBM Avenger torpedo bomber (representing Bush's days as a Navy pilot), an F/A-18 Hornet strike fighter, and an F-35C Lightning II, superimposed one upon the other in reverse chronological order of the individual aircraft's service entry date, and in diminishing scale so each outline is contained within that of the newer aircraft.

Fouled anchors and shields, centered on naval aviators wings, honor the ship's namesake's aviation history. Finally, the motto "Freedom at Work" is adapted from Bush's inaugural speech, during which he said, "We know what works: Freedom works. We know what’s right: Freedom is right."

Description
George H.W. Bush measures  and displaces over 100,000 tons, making her one of the world's largest warships (though she is slightly shorter than ). Her top speed exceeds 30 knots; powered with two nuclear reactors, she can operate for more than 20 years without refueling.

Several features differentiate CVN-77 from other ships in the Nimitz class.

Hull
New features include a bulbous bow design that provides more buoyancy to the forward end of the ship and improves hull efficiency, curved flight deck edges to reduce radar signature, a new underwater hull coating system, deck modernized coverings to reduce ship weight by 100 tons, low solar absorptive and anti-stain paint, a less cluttered hangar bay, and a new propeller design.

Island

George H.W. Bush is the second carrier to have a modernized island, which includes a new radar tower (enclosed to reduce radar signature), navigation system upgrades, communication systems enhancements, and armored windows. The island is smaller and has been repositioned further aft to improve flight deck access and reduce signature and electronic self-interference.

Air operations
New air operations design features include an updated aviation fuel storage and distribution system, semi-automated refueling and servicing with new deck locations to provide faster, more efficient aircraft pit stops, requiring fewer people, modernized aircraft launch, and recovery equipment, and redesigned jet blast deflectors.

Environmental
Environmental upgrades have also been designed into the ship, including a vacuum collection/marine sanitation device (VC/MSD), a new marine sewage system that uses sea water in lieu of fresh water for lower maintenance costs. Many older ships in the U.S. Navy utilize a gravity-driven collection holding and transfer (CHT) system to handle sewage waste. Newer U.S. Navy ships, including now CVN-77, collect sewage waste by vacuum, allowing for greater flexibility in piping installation, smaller pipe sizes overall and reducing water consumption. The collection tanks of George H.W. Bush were modified to accommodate both the VCHT (Vacuum CHT) equipment and the elements of a marine sanitization device to treat the waste prior to discharge. George H.W. Bush is the only aircraft carrier in the U.S. Navy to combine the two technologies.

This new VC/MSD driven waste management system has, however, not been without problems. Reports began surfacing immediately after delivery in May 2009 of issues with the ship's toilet system. As of November 2011, the entire system has gone down at least twice, rendering all 423 commodes in the ship's 130 heads inoperable, with many more incidents that have rendered either half of the ship, or sections of the ship, without operating sanitary facilities. In one ship-wide incident, a repair crew spent 35 non-stop hours attempting to return the system to working order. The system is said to suffer breakdowns when inappropriate materials such as feminine hygiene products are flushed down the toilets. During a four-month maintenance period in the dock in 2012, anti-clog measures were installed in the ship's toilet disposal systems.

Electronics and communications
New electronics and communications technology, space rearrangement, operational procedure changes, advanced sensor technologies and maintenance systems have been incorporated to reduce manning costs. A new zonal electrical distribution system will keep problems from affecting other parts of the ship. Automated material movement devices, semi-autonomous, gravity compensated weapons handling devices, damage control automation systems and components have also been installed. Medical and dental equipment have been upgraded, integrated display screens in Damage Control Central have been modernized to improve data integration and display, and equipment in general shops has been modernized to improve productivity.

History

The contract to build CVN-77 was awarded to Northrop Grumman Shipbuilding Newport News on 26 January 2001. A naming ceremony was held on 9 December 2002 at Northrop Grumman Newport News, with former president George H.W. Bush attending. Secretary of the Navy Gordon R. England, presided at the ceremony.

Construction
Construction took place at the Northrop Grumman Newport News shipyard's Dry Dock 12, the largest in the western hemisphere. The keel laying ceremony was held on 6 September 2003, with former president George H. W. Bush serving as the keynote speaker. Former First Lady Barbara Bush also attended with their daughter, Dorothy Bush Koch, the ship's sponsor. The former president authenticated the keel by chalking his initials onto a metal plate. His initials were then welded onto the plate, which was permanently affixed to the ship.

The ship was modularly constructed, where large sections are assembled and then lifted into place using a large crane. Major milestones in the construction include the bow placement in March 2005, followed by the island placement on 8 July 2006. The  island was lifted onto the flight deck in a ceremony called "stepping the mast" which dates from antiquity and consists of placing coins or other items of significance under the step or bottom of a ship's mast during construction. George H. W. Bush participated in the event, placing his naval aviator wings underneath the island during the ceremony.

George H.W. Bush was christened on 7 October 2006. Former president George H. W. Bush attended the ceremony and became the first president in history to participate in the christening of his namesake ship. President George W. Bush also attended and honored his father during the ceremony as a special guest speaker. Other officials participating in the ceremony included Secretary of Defense Donald Rumsfeld, Secretary of the Navy Donald Winter; Virginia Senators John Warner and George Allen, Virginia Gov. Tim Kaine, and Chief of Naval Operations Admiral Michael Mullen.

Other construction milestones included catapult system testing on the ship's flight deck on 25 January 2008. Former president George H. W. Bush signaled the launch of two "dead loads" off the deck of the carrier. Dead loads are large, wheeled, steel vessels weighing up to  simulating the weight of actual aircraft.

On 11 August 2008, the Pre-Commissioning Unit (PCU) crew moved aboard the ship, the first meals were served in the galley, the U.S. flag was raised on the fantail for the first time, and the first watches were set. George H.W. Bush left Northrop Grumman Ship Building for the first time on 23 December 2008, proceeding a few miles down river to Norfolk Naval Station.

Commissioning

George H.W. Bush was commissioned 10 January 2009 at Norfolk Naval Station prior to her official delivery to the Navy, in a ceremony attended by approximately 15,000 people. President George W. Bush delivered the principal address, George H. W. Bush set the first watch, and ship's sponsor Dorothy "Doro" Bush Koch gave the order to "man our ship and bring her to life!" A GM-built Grumman TBM Avenger like the one then-Lieutenant junior grade George Bush flew in World War II performed a fly-over.

Northrop Grumman Corporation Builder's sea trials were completed on 16 February 2009, providing an opportunity to test systems, components and compartments at sea for the first time. The trials included high-speed runs and a demonstration of the carrier's other capabilities. Following builder's trials, the ship underwent acceptance trials on 10 April 2009, conducted by representatives of the U.S. Navy Board of Inspection and Survey, to test and evaluate the ship's systems and performance.

Delivery and shakedown
George H.W. Bush was officially delivered to the Navy on 11 May 2009.

The first fixed-wing flights were conducted on 19 May 2009 when F/A-18 Super Hornets from Air Test and Evaluation Squadron at Naval Air Station Patuxent River, Maryland began flight deck certification, which tests a carrier's ability to conduct air operations.

On 26 May 2009, former president George H.W. Bush and his daughter, Dorothy Bush Koch, flew aboard the carrier to observe flight operations during the ship's underway period in the Atlantic Ocean. USS George H.W. Bush successfully completed her first flight deck certification on that day.

George H.W. Bush returned to Northrop Grumman Newport News shipyard on 18 June 2009 for post-delivery maintenance work, also known as the ship's post shakedown availability (PSA). A PSA is a typical availability in the early life of a carrier that allows the Navy and builder to resolve any items that came up during trials and delivery and make any last-minute changes and upgrades. Work includes the installation of a Rigid Hull Inflatable Boat (RHIB) handling system and a new fresh water purification system. Other changes include compartment reconfigurations, combat system and radar equipment upgrades, and minor repairs. The work was scheduled to last through early 2010.

Maiden 2011 deployment

The ship was assigned to Carrier Strike Group Two for her first deployment. Under the command of Rear Admiral Nora Tyson, George H.W. Bush, Carrier Air Wing Eight and the four ships of her group departed on her first deployment on 11 May 2011. They sailed across the Atlantic to Britain to participate in Exercise Saxon Warrior, held in the Western Approaches and culminating in a so-called 'Thursday War'. She then moved towards Portsmouth, United Kingdom, on 27 May, anchoring adjacent to Stokes Bay through 31 May, because she was too large to enter the harbor, and the naval base did not have sufficient nuclear berths for the carrier to moor alongside. The carrier arrived at Naples, Italy on 10 June 2011.

The carrier returned to Norfolk on 10 December 2011, following a seven-month deployment supporting operations with the U.S. Navy's 5th and 6th fleets.

2012

On 25 July 2012, George H.W. Bush began her four-month overhaul at Norfolk Naval Shipyard at Portsmouth, Virginia, included scheduled short-term technical upgrades. On 1 December 2012, George H.W. Bush completed her PIA maintenance cycle and began sea trials on 3 December 2012. After completing sea trials on 4 December 2012, the carrier started her training and qualification cycle in preparation for the group's 2013 deployment.

2013
During a two-week underway period beginning 14 January 2013, George H.W. Bush tested the MV-22 tilt-rotor aircraft from squadron VMX-22 as a potential carrier onboard delivery aircraft as well as operating mine-sweeping MH-53E helicopters from squadron HM-14.

During another underway period, George H.W. Bush conducted at-sea tests for X-47B unmanned drone in the Atlantic Ocean, including the first time that an unmanned drone has been catapulted off an aircraft carrier on the morning of 14 May 2013 (pictured). On 17 May 2013, another first was achieved when the X-47B performed touch-and-go landings and take-offs on the flight deck of Bush while underway in the Atlantic Ocean. Also during this two-week underway period, the aircraft carrier tested a new torpedo self-defense system, as well as completed more than 115 launches and landings in assessing a new precision landing system, before returning to Norfolk on 24 May 2013.

On 10 July 2013, an unmanned X-47B drone completed an arrested landing on the flight deck of George H.W. Bush. The landing marks the first time any unmanned aircraft had completed an arrested landing on board an aircraft carrier operating at sea. The drone completed a second successful arrested landing on George H.W. Bush, but it was diverted to the Wallops Flight Facility in Virginia after an issue was detected, requiring that a planned third landing to be aborted. One of the drone's three navigational sub-systems failed, which was identified by the other two sub-systems. The anomaly was indicated to the mission operator, who followed test plan procedures to abort the landing. The Navy stated that the aircraft's detection of a problem demonstrated its reliability and ability to operate autonomously. On 15 July 2013, in a fourth attempt, an X-47B drone failed to make a successful flight deck landing on board the vessel due to "technical issues."

2014 deployment

In late February 2014, George H.W. Bush transited the Strait of Gibraltar on the way to a stop in Piraeus, Greece, for a scheduled port visit.

On 5 March 2014, George H.W. Bush arrived off southern Turkey, which is under 500 miles away from Crimea, amid developing tensions over Ukraine with Russia. On 9 March 2014, the carrier entered port in Antalya, in southern Turkey. Some news sources had speculated that the ship's stay in the Mediterranean Sea would be extended as a result of the annexation of Crimea, but this proved to not be the case with Carrier Strike Group 2 proceeding through the Suez Canal.

The carrier was transiting the Suez Canal on 18 March 2014. On 23 March  officially turned over the watch to George H.W. Bush in the U.S. 5th Fleet area of responsibility conducting maritime security operations and supporting theater security cooperation efforts.

On 14 June 2014, George H.W. Bush was ordered to the Persian Gulf to protect US interests in Iraq in light of the militant group Islamic State of Iraq and the Levant's (ISIL) offensive and takeover of several major cities in that country.

On 8 August 2014, two F/A-18F Super Hornets launched from the ship and dropped  laser-guided bombs on an ISIL mobile artillery cannon shelling Kurdish forces outside their capital city, Erbil. The mission was launched in accordance with President Obama's announcement on the evening of 7 August that the US would begin airstrikes to protect US personnel and the Yazidis in the region from ISIL attacks.

On 23 September 2014 F/A-18 Hornets and Super Hornets from Carrier Air Wing Eight launched from George H.W. Bush in the Persian Gulf to strike at specific targets in Syria such as command-and-control centers, training camps, and weapons depots.

On 15 November 2014, George H.W. Bush returned to her homeport in Norfolk, Virginia after a nine-month deployment.

2017 deployment

Following a 14-month shipyard availability at Norfolk Naval Shipyard and a compressed training cycle, George H.W. Bush and Carrier Air Wing Eight departed Norfolk on 21 January for her third deployment. She transited the Strait of Gibraltar on 2 February and after a port visit to Souda Bay, Crete, she again participated in strikes against ISIL in support of Operation Inherent Resolve.

In July 2017, George H.W. Bush arrived in the UK to take part in Exercise Saxon Warrior, a joint exercise involving Carrier Strike Group 2 plus elements of the Royal Navy, German Navy, Royal Norwegian Navy and Swedish Navy.

2018
In May 2018, George H.W. Bush took part in the Franco-American exercise Chesapeake Mission, with twelve Dassault Aviation Rafale M and a Grumman E-2C Hawkeye from the French Navy embarked on board.

2019
In February 2019, George H.W. Bush arrived at Norfolk Naval Shipyard for a planned 28-month docking planned incremental availability (DPIA). This was the ship's first DPIA.

The United States Navy announced on 24 September that there had been three suicides aboard George H.W. Bush in one week. Two previous ship suicides had taken place in November 2017 and July 2019.

2020 
On , Navy Times reported that a spokesperson for Naval Air Force Atlantic confirmed that a "small number" of sailors assigned to George H.W. Bush had tested positive for COVID-19 during the summer. The spokesperson declined to provide an exact number of sailors or a more precise date regarding when the virus was detected, citing US Defense Department policy, but added that the carrier was not deployed at the time, and that those infected "remain[ed] in isolation at their private residences in Virginia and receive[d] daily medical supportive care".

In August 2020, George H.W. Bush left dry dock at Norfolk Naval Shipyard, after 18 months of the planned two-year overhaul. It was the vessel's most extensive maintenance period and marked the first time out of water since she was built. The overhaul was the most complex undertaken at the shipyard to date, according to the Navy.

2022 
On 10 August 2022, George H.W. Bush, with Carrier Air Wing 7 (CVW-7) embarked, began a deployment as part of Carrier Strike Group 10 (CSG-10). This marks the carrier's first deployment since her 2017 deployment, after which she underwent major maintenance. CSG-10 is reportedly set to relieve Carrier Strike Group 8 (CSG-8) and its flagship, in the Mediterranean Sea. On 25 August 2022, George H.W. Bush and CSG-10 transited the Strait of Gibraltar and entered the Mediterranean Sea.

References

Notes

Further reading

External links

 Official website
 U.S. Navy, USS George H.W. Bush (CVN 77) Story Archive
 USS George H.W. Bush (CVN 77) News  – U.S. Navy
 Shipyard: CVN 77 section of the Northrop Grumman Newport News site
 Crew: The Navy's Pre-Commissioning Unit for CVN 77
 1998 Article "Front Loading the CVN 77..." which analyzes how the DoD's changes to initial funding affect long range savings in procurement
 A video on how the CVN-77 was made.
 C-SPAN video of the Ship's Commissioning Ceremony

Nimitz-class aircraft carriers
2006 ships
Aircraft carriers of the United States
Nuclear ships of the United States Navy
Carrier Strike Group Two
Ships built in Newport News, Virginia